Nikulyata is a rural locality (a village) in Dobryansky District, Perm Krai, Russia. The population was 4 as of 2010. There is 1 street.

Geography 
Nikulyata is located 54 km east of Dobryanka (the district's administrative centre) by road. Golubyata is the nearest rural locality.

References 

Rural localities in Dobryansky District